Arrecifes is a city in Buenos Aires Province, Argentina. It is the administrative seat of Arrecifes Partido.

History
 20 September 1586 the first time which a Spanish conqueror mentioned in his notes: "Pago de los Arrecifes", this is the oldest notice of the early days of Arrecifes. The first population at the Arrecifes river banks appeared after 1600. At this time it was a forced path to cross the Arrecifes river in the route to Alto-Peru and Chile.
 1767: The "Cabildo" (In the Spanish colony, cabildos were in charge of the city administration and the justice) created the Arrecifes district, the second in the province.
 1785: The first mayor is elected.
 1 March 1856: The first city hall is built and the local government established.
 1950: Officially declared a city in Arrecifes district.
 The name of the District changes a lot of time for "Bartolomé Mitre" a Governor of Buenos Aires province.
 1994: Last change, since 1994 is Arrecifes District.
 Capital of motorsports. Bordered by the homonymous river and an attractive seaside resort, Arrecifes is recognized as the largest quarry sporting motorists of Argentina. It is the only city in the country, with both drivers running in Formula One (Jose Froilan Gonzalez, runner-up to Ferrari World and Norberto Fontana, with Sauber) .It highlighted Asturian and Castulo Hortal Ubaldo brothers and the son of this, Newton. the highlights arrecifeños currently running in national categories are: Norberto Fontana, Rubén Bulla, José Luis Di Palma, Patricio Di Palma, Marcos Di Palma, Josito Di Palma, Julio César Catalán Magni (fueguino based in Reefs), Martín Ferrari Marcos Cuirolo Augustine Canapino and Juan Cruz Alvarez. Canapino Alberto, one of the most successful coaches in the country, is also born and have their workshops in Reefs. Represented in the city distinas times, pilots from the likes of: Angel Lo Valvo, Julio Perez, Sandokan, Carlos Marincovich Nestor Jesus Garcia Veiga, Carlos Pairetti, Luis Di Palma and Gaston Aguirre, among others.

Known as Cradle of champions. Another football champion from Arrecifes is Pablo Zabaleta, the only Arrecifeño world champion, enshrined in the Netherlands as captain of the Argentina Under 20 Champion in addition to San Lorenzo de Almagro, I integrate the ranks of Espanyol, several years with Manchester City in England, and since June 2017 playing for the one of the bigger teams in Premier League in London, West Ham United F.C.

References

 
Populated places in Buenos Aires Province
Populated places established in 1586
Cities in Argentina
Argentina

fr:Arrecifes (partido)
it:Partido di Arrecifes
pt:Arrecifes (partido)